Ann Strickler Zweig is a scientist at the University of California, Santa Cruz's Jack Baskin School of Engineering.

Zweig is a senior program manager with the UCSC Genome Browser project. Zweig was one of the Web of Science Group's 2019 recipients of the highly-cited-researchers designation under biology and biochemistry. The designation "identifies scientists and social scientists who produced multiple papers ranking in the top 1% by citations for their field and year of publication, demonstrating significant research influence among their peers."

Zweig is also involved in the UCSC SARS-CoV-2 Genome Browser, a research tool for the virus that causes COVID-19.

Previous work
Zweig co-founded and was the president and chief operating officer of Omni-Vista, Inc., a corporation in Colorado.

Zweig holds a patent for a "method for providing bi-directional propagation among data within spreadsheets."

Zweig was a writer in The Wiley Guide to Project Technology, Supply Chain, and Procurement Management.

References

Living people
American geneticists
University of California, Santa Cruz staff
American women geneticists
University of Kansas alumni
University of Colorado alumni
20th-century American scientists
20th-century American women scientists
21st-century American scientists
21st-century American women scientists
Year of birth missing (living people)
American patent holders